Sarain Fox is a Canadian Anishinaabe activist, broadcaster and filmmaker. She is most noted for her 2020 documentary film Inendi, for which she received a Canadian Screen Award nomination for Best Host or Interviewer in a News or Information Program or Series at the 9th Canadian Screen Awards in 2021.

A member of the Batchewana First Nation of Ojibways from near Sault Ste. Marie, Ontario, she has also been host of the Viceland/APTN documentary series Rise, and cohost of APTN's documentary series Future History.

She appeared as a guest judge in episodes 4 and 5 of the third season of Canada's Drag Race,  as well as episode 2 of Canada's Drag Race: Canada vs. the World.

References

External links

21st-century First Nations people
Canadian documentary film directors
Canadian women film directors
Canadian television hosts
First Nations filmmakers
Ojibwe people
People from Algoma District
Living people
Year of birth missing (living people)
Canadian women documentary filmmakers